PLUNA Líneas Aéreas Uruguayas S.A. was the flag carrier of Uruguay. It was headquartered in Carrasco, Montevideo and operated scheduled services within South America, as well as scheduled cargo and charter services from its hub at Carrasco International Airport.

On 5 July 2012, only two days after the carrier's employees went on strike amid mounting financial difficulties, the Uruguayan government decided to close the airline down and liquidate it. The carrier was wholly owned by the government at the time of its closure.

History

Foundation 

The airline was established in September 1936, and started operations the following month, on 19 November 1936. It was set up by Jorge and Alberto Márquez Vaesa, two brothers who had obtained the necessary financial and technical support through the ambassador of the United Kingdom to Uruguay at the time, Sir Eugen Millington-Drake. Millington-Drake wrote in his memoirs that he suggested the airline be named using a memorable acronym, taking SABENA as an example. It was then decided on "PLUNA", an acronym for Primeras Líneas Uruguayas de Navegación Aérea. Millington-Drake knew De Havilland's representative in Buenos Aires at the time, which helped in the acquisition of the airline's first aircraft. The airline flew two five-seater de Havilland Dragonflys from Montevideo to Salto and Paysandú. The two planes were christened Churrinche and San Alberto, the latter in honor of the brothers' father. PLUNA flew 2,600 passengers in their first fiscal year, a huge success for that era. It also flew 20,000 pieces of mail and 70,000 newspapers.

The carrier saw the incorporation of both the Potez 62 and the Douglas DC-2 into its fleet in the early 1940s, the latter acquired from the U.S. government. Following the outbreak of World War II, PLUNA was forced to suspend operations between 1942, and 1944, due to the lack of spare parts. The delicate position PLUNA was in at this time led the Uruguayan Government to aid the company by boosting its stake to 85% on 16 October 1944. The first Douglas DC-3 entered PLUNA's fleet in February 1946. The airline launched regular services to Porto Alegre, Brazil, in May 1948. The carrier later added the cities of Santa Cruz in Bolivia and Buenos Aires, Rosario and Córdoba in Argentina to its network.

Nationalisation 

The airline became a wholly government-owned company on 12 November 1951. After World War II, PLUNA's fleet included two Douglas DC-2s which were operated on the Montevideo–Paysandú–Salto route until they were retired by 1951. In the same year, a Douglas DC-3 and four de Havilland Herons were added to the fleet. The Herons only stayed in PLUNA's fleet for a short time and by 1957, they had been sold. The DC-3s remained in service much longer, and in 1971, the last four of them were sold to the Fuerza Aérea Uruguaya.

São Paulo was added to the route network in January 1954. On 24 June 1958, the carrier entered the turbine era with the delivery of its first of three Vickers Viscounts four-engined turboprops purchased new from Vickers; it later acquired two Viscount 700s from Alitalia and three Viscount 800s from VASP.

PLUNA's growth slowed considerably for the next three decades, but it entered the jet age soon after jets were introduced to the world, and added John F. Kennedy International Airport (JFK) in New York, and Miami to its destinations, using Boeing 707 and Boeing 737 aircraft.

In the 1980s, PLUNA began flying to Madrid, Asunción, Rio de Janeiro and Santiago de Chile, but services to JFK and Miami were suspended. In the meantime, as the city of Punta del Este flourished as a major tourist destination, PLUNA benefited from that. During this time, an office was also opened in Tel Aviv, Israel.

Privatisation 
The 1990s, saw financial trouble loom for PLUNA. In 1995, the company was transformed into a public–private partnership and the government sold 51% of the shares to a holding formed by an Argentine consortium named Tevycom and Uruguayan businessmen; the holding later sold half of its participation in PLUNA to Varig.

At , the airline had  employees. At this time the fleet consisted of  Boeing 737-200 Advanced and  McDonnell Douglas DC-10-30 to serve a network that included Asunción, Buenos Aires, Cordoba, Florianópolis, Madrid, Montevideo, Punta del Este, Rio de Janeiro, Rosario, Salvador, Santiago and São Paulo. By late , the airline's major shareholders were the Government of Uruguay (49%) and Varig (49%), and private investors held the balance. When Varig entered Chapter 11 bankruptcy protection on 17 June 2005, it sought a bidder for its 49% stake in PLUNA.

On 4 January 2007, the Government of Uruguay started negotiations to sell 75% of it shares to a private consortium of investors from Germany, United States, Uruguay and Argentina called Leadgate Investment, a subsidiary of Latin American Regional Aviation Holding Corporation (LARAH), that committed to inject  million in the company. In July the same year, the government awarded 75% of PLUNA's stock to LARAH, and the acquisition of seven Bombardier CRJ-900s in a deal worth  million was announced.

In late , PLUNA presented its new corporate image, developed by Australian design company Cato Partners. This new image is based on the interpretation of the name "Uruguay" as meaning "river of the painted birds" or "river of the colorful birds". The first of seven brand new CRJ900s that would be incorporated into the fleet during 2008 arrived in March that year; these new aircraft permitted increasing frequencies to existing routes, as well as expanding services to new destinations.

In , the Canadian airline holding company Jazz Air Income Fund invested  million in LARAH. The move gave this holding an indirect control of 25% of the Uruguayan flag carrier, as LARAH had a participation of 75% into PLUNA at that time; the Government of Uruguay held the balance.

In September and October 2010, three additional new CRJ900s aircraft were delivered from the Bombardier factory. In April 2011, three options were taken up for delivery at the end of 2011 and these were delivered between September and November 2011. With these additions, PLUNA's fleet consisted of 13 airplanes, the highest number in its history.

Collapse
In early , PLUNA's then CEO, Matías Campiani, disclosed that the airline might face collapse amid a financial distress that led to a loss of  million for the eight months ending in February the same year, partly due to the protectionism of the government of Argentina —where the carrier concentrated 21% of its operations— following the renationalisation of Aerolíneas Argentinas in 2008, and partly due to the slowdown of the Brazilian economy in the preceding months. Later on, with losses totalling  million, Leadgate disposed of their 75% stake in the airline, transferring it back to the Uruguayan government. By that time, that percentage of PLUNA's stock was owned by LARAH, which was in turn 75% owned by Leadgate and 25% by Jazz Air. Despite being initially disclosed that Jazz Air was not interested in taking over the entire 75% stock, and that it was later informed that the Canadian airline was evaluating the acquisition, the government suspended PLUNA's operations on —following a strike that started two days earlier, after failing to find new investors for the company. The government announced that both PLUNA's fleet and routes would be auctioned. It seemed there were no plans for the government to have any stake in PLUNA's successor.

In , the auction of the seven Bombardier aircraft that belonged to the liquidated carrier was delayed until  as there were no bidders. Cosmo Airlines, a Spanish charter carrier, eventually purchased the seven aircraft at a price of $137 million. Regionally, the void created by PLUNA's collapse benefited foreign airlines on some routes.

In 2016, a Uruguayan court concluded that no Leadgate executives were responsible for Pluna's collapse. Two years later, in 2018 a Panamanian-based investment consortium named Caballero Verde S. de R.L. took ownership of LARAH, which still owned 75% of Pluna's shares. The consortium plans to seek compensation from the Uruguayan government for Pluna's demise.

Destinations 

, PLUNA linked Uruguay with two destinations in Argentina, one in Chile, one in Paraguay, and eight in Brazil.

Codeshare agreements 
PLUNA had a codeshare agreement with Iberia, which operates the Montevideo–Madrid–Montevideo route. Under the same codeshare agreement, passengers also connected from Madrid to many destinations within Spain and also to Frankfurt. PLUNA also announced a codeshare agreement with American Airlines, which would have placed PLUNA's code on American's Miami-Montevideo route, if it had government approval.

Fleet

Fleet at bankruptcy

Prior to its collapse, PLUNA's fleet consisted of the following aircraft, .

Historical fleet
The carrier also operated the following aircraft types throughout its history:

Accidents and incidents 
PLUNA had only one fatal accident with the loss of ten crew members, the Aviation Safety Network records 3 hull-loss accidents/incidents for the airline.

8 January 1946: A Douglas DC-2-124, registration CX-AEG, was destroyed during a thunderstorm in Uruguay.
9 October 1962: A Douglas C-47A, registration CX-AGE, crashed during a final test flight. The crash occurred during takeoff from Carrasco International Airport, when the right wing grazed the runway, bouncing the aircraft and causing the right tire to burst, then bouncing the aircraft again causing the engine to smash into the ground at almost full throttle, and finally rolling over and coming to rest upside down. A fire broke out shortly afterwards. All 10 crew members died.
11 May 1975: A Vickers 769D Viscount, registration CX-AQO, flying a scheduled Carrasco International Airport–Buenos Aires-Aeroparque service, ran off the end of the runway at the destination airport on landing. The damage wrote off the aircraft. All 57 passengers and crew survived the incident.

See also
 Transport in Uruguay
 List of defunct airlines of South America

References

External links

Memorias del Tiempo de Vuelo (In Spanish)

Defunct airlines of Uruguay
1936 establishments in Uruguay
Airlines established in 1936
Airlines disestablished in 2012
Latin American and Caribbean Air Transport Association
Companies based in Montevideo
Former Star Alliance affiliate members